Seperacija is an artificial lake near Đurđevac, Croatia. It is a gravel pit, created in the mid-1960s.

Sources
https://web.archive.org/web/20130312001757/http://www.zsrk-djurdjevac.com/separacija.php 

Lakes of Croatia
Landforms of Koprivnica-Križevci County